Nordelph is a civil parish near Downham Market in the English county of Norfolk.

In 1930 a new civil parish of Nordelph was created in Downham Rural District, taking land mostly out of the Marshland RD parishes of Upwell and Outwell.

For the purposes of local government, Nordelph falls within the district of King's Lynn and West Norfolk.

The Church of England parish church, Holy Trinity, is of brick in the Early English style, and was erected in 1865 as a chapel of ease to the parish church of Upwell.  A new ecclesiastical parish was formed in 1909 from the parishes of Upwell, Downham West, Denver, Stow Bardolph and Outwell. The Reverend Edwin Emmanuel Bradford (1860–1944), Uranian poet and novelist, was vicar of Nordelph from 1909 to 1944. In 1912, there were also Wesleyan Methodist and United Methodist chapels.

Further reading

References

External links

King's Lynn and West Norfolk
Villages in Norfolk
Civil parishes in Norfolk